Lahad Datu Airport  is an airport located in the southeastern part of the Malaysian state of Sabah. The airport can accommodate aircraft as large as the ATR72, and the terminal building can handle up to 100,000 passengers annually. In 2016, the airport handled 140,077 passengers and 3,713 aircraft movements.

Airlines and destinations

Traffic and Statistics

Traffic

References

External links
 Lahad Datu Airport, Sabah at Malaysia Airports Holdings Berhad
 

Airports in Sabah
Lahad Datu District